Mainalo is the tallest mountain in the Menalon highlands of the Peloponnese, and is located in Arcadia, Greece. In antiquity, the mountain was especially sacred to Pan.

In the 19th and early 20th century, the mountain was known as Apano Chrepa.

Geography 
Mainalo's ground is primarily made of lime, among various calcareous substrates.

Mainalo has various named peaks. Listed by height, they are, among others;
 Ostrakina or Profitis Ilias at 
 Pateritsa at 
 Aidini at 
 Mavri Koryfi at 
 Mourtzia at 
 Mesovouni at 
 Krevatia at 
 Epano Chrepa at 
 Lioritsi at 
 Sterna at

Ecology 

The mountain houses many forests of Greek fir and Crimean pine. Natura 2000 cites these forests as the "[Greek fir and Crimean pine's] best representation in Peloponnisos." 

Mainalo has several ecological environments, comprising: 
 Mediterranean arborescent matorrals, covering  of the mountain, this environment consists of Mediterranean and sub-Mediterranean sclerophyllous evergreen shrublands grouped under arborescent junipers.:59
 Endemic oro-Mediterranean heaths with gorse, covering  of the mountain, this environment consists of a dry mountainous environment. Mediterranean heaths are usually dominated by Genista, while containing various other, often spined, shrubs like Acantholimon, Astragalus, Erinacea, Bupleurum, Ptilotrichum, Echinospartum, and Anthyllis. This environment also includes a variety of Asteraceae and Lamiaceae.:53
 Calcareous rocky slopes with chasmophytic vegetation, covering  of the mountain, this environment consists of limestone cliffs and screes, featuring great ecological diversity, with many endemic plants growing in fissures within rock.:96

Many amphibians, reptiles, mammals, insects, and diurnal predatory birds inhabit Mainalo. These include, among others;
 Reptiles such as the Balkan whip snake, marginated tortoise, Kotschy's gecko, Greek rock lizard, Peloponnese wall lizard, European copper skink, and the horned viper.
 Mammals such as the European hare, beech marten, European badger, lesser noctule bat, edible dormouse, Thomas's pine vole, and the western broad-toothed field mice.
 Amphibians such as the European green toad, European tree frog, and the Syrian spadefoot.
 Birds such as the northern goshawk, Eurasian sparrowhawk, common buzzard, common kestrel, and the peregrine falcon.
 Insects such as the Kretania sephirus butterfly, Persian skipper butterfly, eastern orange tip butterfly and the mountain small white butterfly.

Notable people 
The following people were associated with the ancient city Maenalus, which may have stood near the summit of Mainalo: 
Androsthenes of Maenalus, a pankratiast who won gold in the ancient Olympic Games in 420 and 416 BC.:27:10
Damoxenidas of Maenalus, a boxer who won gold in the ancient Olympic Games in 384 BC.:159:246
Ephotion of Maenalus, a pankratiast who won gold in the ancient Olympic Games in 464 BC.:60
Euthymenes of Maenalus, a boys' and adult wrestler who won gold in the ancient Olympic Games in 400 and 392 BC.:66
Nicodamus of Maenalus, a sculptor who made statues of ancient Olympic victors and Greek mythological figures.
Phormis of Maenalus, a distinguished fighter who became rich in service of Gelo.
Xenocles of Maenalus, a boys' wrestler who won gold in the ancient Olympic Games in 372 BC.:177

References

External links 

Mainalo Ski Center 
Forecasts on Mainalo
University of Patras article on Mainalo and the Menalon highlands 

Landforms of Arcadia, Peloponnese
Mountains of Peloponnese (region)
Mountains of Greece
Ski areas and resorts in Greece